The Swan View Tunnel is a former railway tunnel located on the southern side of the Jane Brook valley in the outer Perth suburb of Swan View in the John Forrest National Park on the edge of the Darling Scarp. After its closure as a railway tunnel, it reopened as part of the John Forrest Heritage Trail, a rail trail.

Prior to the construction of tunnels and the sinking of the Subiaco railway station in 1999, the Swan View Tunnel was the only tunnel on the Western Australian railway network.

Construction

Swan View Tunnel was built on an alignment which replaced the original Eastern Railway passing through Smiths Mill, (now Glen Forrest), and Mundaring. The project to build the new line, including the Swan View Tunnel, was managed by the Western Australian Government Railways Engineer-in-Chief,  O'Connor.

Work began in 1894, with the two bores meeting on 18 April 1895. The tunnel opened on 22 February 1896. The unstable nature of the jointed granite, along with clay seams, caused difficulties during construction of the tunnel. A masonry-lined face prevented rock falls, but reduced the inner diameter.

The deviation from the original railway line, and the tunnel in particular, was a "significant technical feat for the time"; Engineers Australia awarded the deviation an Engineering Heritage Marker as part of its Engineering Heritage Recognition Program.

Problems 
The tunnel's small diameter combined with the steep gradient (1:49) caused smoke accumulation. Incidents involving near-asphyxiation of train crews started in 1896, and continued throughout the tunnel's operating life. The first serious incident of this nature was in 1903.

The tunnel's design was incompatible with the ASG class Garratt steam locomotives used by the Western Australian Government Railways in the 1940s. The subsequent Royal Commission into the ASG dealt with design of the locomotive, and the very dangerous clearances.

The worst accident in the tunnel was on 5 November 1942, when both drivers and firemen were overcome by carbon monoxide, one driver dying, when a fully laden double-header train passed through the tunnel at walking pace. Further cases occurred in 1943 and 1944 on up trains.

Subsequent industrial strikes, a Royal Commission and union agitation for the locomotives' withdrawal was a significant issue in the 1940s.

Deviation
Between 1934 and 1945, a signal cabin was located at Tunnel Junction, on the eastern end of the tunnel, for managing the transition from the tunnel's single line to the dual lines of the system.

The single line tunnel was considered unsafe for eastbound (climbing) trains, and a diversion was added on the northern side of the hill that the tunnel passed through.

It was known as the deviation, and due to rock instability included a fence of 16 wires to be used as a detector of rock falls. The diversion was completed on 25 November 1945.

Railway closure
The railway line through the tunnel was lifted after the closing of the older and steeper Eastern Railway and the opening of the Avon Valley diversion that opened in February 1966.

After the 1960s, gates/doors were put at either end of the tunnel though these were later removed.

The tunnel remains intact and has reopened as part of the John Forrest Heritage Trail, part of the larger Railway Reserve Heritage Trail. During the 1990s, the government authority in which the tunnel land was vested, the Department of Environment and Conservation allowed a number of night time "ghost walks" in the tunnel as part of the Hills Forest programmes.

References

Bibliography

Eastern Railway (Western Australia)
Swan View, Western Australia
Tunnels completed in 1895
Railway tunnels in Western Australia
Disused tunnels in Australia
Recipients of Engineers Australia engineering heritage markers